The Batong Line of the Beijing Subway is an east–west rapid transit line in eastern Beijing. Through operation with Line 1 started on August 29, 2021.

The Batong Line derives its name by combining the first character of Bawangfen, another name for Sihui, and Tongzhou, the eastern suburban district of Beijing which the line serves.

The colour of the Batong Line that is shown on maps, like that of Line 1, is red.

The line tends to be very crowded during rush hour. To alleviate this headways were reduced and express services were introduced during rush hour in early 2020. However, these express services were removed with the start of through operation with Line 1 in mid 2021.

Hours of operation
The first east-bound train departs Sihui at 6:00am. The first west-bound train departs Huazhuang at 5:16am. The last east-bound train leaves Sihui at 11:40pm. The last west-bound train leaves Huazhuang at 10:56pm.

Route
The Batong Line follows the Beijing-Tongzhou Expressway eastward from Sihui to Guǎnzhuang. Between Gaobeidian and Guǎnzhuang, the Batong Line and its stations are built into the highway's median. At Bali Qiao, the Batong Line turns to the southeast and follows the Jingtang Road to Tu Qiao, which is located just inside the Tuqiao Bridge exit on the eastern 6th Ring Road.

Stations (from West to East)
Station list for Line 1 and Batong line of Beijing Subway, after the through operation started on August 29, 2021.

Rolling stock

The line uses 6-car Type B rolling stock.

Current

Former

History

Phase 1
Construction of the Batong Line began on December 28, 2001 and the line opened on December 27, 2003.

In 2012, traffic on Batong Line was relieved by the opening of the parallel Line 6, with a 12.14% decrease in daily ridership and a 10–20% reduction in flow during rush hour. However, during peak hours sections the line still operates above 100% capacity.

Southern extension (Phase 2)
There are 2 stations on the southern extension:  station and  station (both are transfer stations with the eastern extension of Line 7). The extension is 4.5 km in length, including 3.8 km underground section.  station was opened on December 28, 2019.  station opened on August 26, 2021.

Opening timeline

Through operations with Line 1

However, the Beijing Subway responded that Line 1's and Batong's signal systems are completely different, so through-operation will be more difficult to achieve from an engineering standpoint. As of 2016, preliminary design and feasibility studies are underway to allow for through operations between Line 1 and Batong. On June 12, 2020, the project of the through operation of Line 1 and Batong line was approved by Beijing Development and Reform Commission. Through operation with Line 1 started on 29 August 2021.

References

External links
 

Beijing Subway lines
Railway lines opened in 2003
2003 establishments in China
750 V DC railway electrification